Merry Marvel Marching Society (often referred to by the abbreviation "M.M.M.S.") was a fan club for Marvel Comics started by Marvel editor Stan Lee and/or Marvel publisher Martin Goodman in 1964.

History 
Following teaser promotion in Marvel comic books cover-dated November 1964, Marvel Comics introduced the company's in-house fan club, the Merry Marvel Marching Society, in its comics cover-dated February 1965, released in the fall 1964.  Generally abbreviated as the "M.M.M.S", the club offered readers a $1 membership kit that initially included a:

 welcoming letter
 membership card
 one-sided, 33 -  rpm record, "The Voices of Marvel"
 scratch pad
 sticker
 pinback button
 certificate 

The company offered permutations of this kit, plus additional promotional merchandise such as posters and sweatshirts, through comics cover-dated October 1969. As author Marc Flores, who writes under the pen name Ronin Ro, described,

The club proved successful, with Marvel secretary and club coordinator Flo Steinberg remarking that they "were working seven days a week just opening these envelopes" containing the subscription fee. In a 2002 interview, Steinberg said,

Soon, the club offered a range of other money-spinning products, including:
 Six-foot "life-size, full-color Spidey pin-up" made from a Steve Ditko drawing of Spider-Man
 $1.50 T-shirt with a Ditko-drawn Dr. Strange
 Thing drawing by Jack Kirby on "Official Swingin' Stationery"
 Fantastic Four family portrait T-shirt by Kirby

The M.M.M.S. membership had ranks indicated by three-letter abbreviations (such as Q.N.S. for "Quite 'Nuff Sayer" to F.F.F. for "Fearless Front-Facer"), based on a proposal by young comics fan Mark Evanier.

The M.M.M.S. was absorbed into the subsequent Marvel fan club, Marvelmania International, in 1969. This second club lasted until 1971. A third official Marvel Comics fan club, FOOM (Friends of Ol' Marvel) followed from 1973 to 1976.

References

Citations

Sources 
 Pratt, Doug. "The MMMS Records Remastered", DogRat.com, September 23, 2007. The Voices of Marvel and Scream Along with Marvel. Archive.org archive, WebCitation archive.

External links 
 

Organizations established in 1964
Organizations disestablished in 1969
Comics fan clubs
Marvel Comics